Gemmatimonas groenlandica is a bacterium species from the genus of Gemmatimonas which has been isolated from Greenland.

References 

Gemmatimonadota
Bacteria described in 2020